Kateryna Yurchenko (born August 19, 1976) is a Ukrainian sprint canoer who competed in the mid-1990s. At the 1996 Summer Olympics in Atlanta, she was eliminated in the semifinals of both the K-2 500 m and the K-4 500 m event.

Yurchenko's father, Vasyl, won two Olympic medals in canoeing in the late 1970s and early 1980s.

References
Sports-Reference.com profile

1976 births
Canoeists at the 1996 Summer Olympics
Living people
Olympic canoeists of Ukraine
Ukrainian female canoeists